The Waterloo Regional Municipality is a large urban area in Southern Ontario comprising the cities of Waterloo, Kitchener and Cambridge and adjacent rural townships which include some towns. The cities have a combined population of 593,833 as of 2020. Kitchener is experiencing a high rise development boom never before seen in a mid size Canadian city. The majority of the high-rises in the area are in Kitchener, though Waterloo does contain a significant amount most of which are within the University District.

The tallest development that is under construction in Waterloo Region is TEK Tower in Kitchener, at 146 m (479ft) and 45 floors. , there are at least 55 high-rises under construction, approved for construction, and proposed for construction in the Waterloo Regional Municipality. Once built, Station Park E at 44 floors and 163 metres will be the tallest building in Kitchener and the Region of Waterloo upon completion. Most of the proposed buildings are within Kitchener continuing the building boom seen in recent years that was primarily spurred by the ION LRT and high tech migration to Kitchener.

Tallest buildings

This includes spires and architectural details but does not include antenna masts.

Proposed and Under Construction

See also

 Canadian architecture
 List of tallest buildings in Canada
List of tallest buildings in Ontario
 List of tallest buildings in Hamilton, Ontario
 List of tallest buildings in London, Ontario
 List of tallest buildings in Toronto

References

Waterloo Regional Municipality

Tallest buildings in Waterloo